Yuanling station is a station on Line 9 of the Shenzhen Metro. It opened on 28 October 2016.

Station layout

Exits

References

Shenzhen Metro stations
Railway stations in Guangdong
Futian District
Luohu District
Railway stations in China opened in 2016